Below is a list of Hungarian language exonyms for places outside of Hungary. It excludes transliterations with the same pronunciation as the endonym, and place names spelled the same.

Albania

Austria
For a list of Hungarian place names in the Burgenland region of Austria, see : Hungarian exonyms (Burgenland)

Belgium

Bosnia-Herzegovina

Bulgaria

China

Croatia
For Hungarian place names in Croatia see: List of Hungarian exonyms for places in Croatia

Cuba

Czech Republic

Cyprus

Denmark

France

Germany

Greece

Italy

Moldova

Netherlands

Poland

Portugal

Romania

Transylvania
Transylvania

Abram Érábrány
Abrămuț Verdresábrány
Abrud Abrudbánya
Abrud-Sat Abrudfalva
Abucea Abucsa
Abud Székely abod
Abuș Abosfalva
Acățari Ákosfalva
Aciliu Ecsellő
Aciua Balotafalu
Aciuța Ácsfalva
Aciș Ákos
Acmariu Akmár
Adalin Adalin
Adămuș Ádámos
Adea Ágya
Adoni Éradony
Adrian Görgényadorján
Adrian 2 Adorján
Adrianu Mare Nagyadorján
Adrianu Mic Kisadorján
Ady Endre Érmindszent
Agadici Agadics
Aghireș Egrespatak
Aghireșu Egeres
Agîrbiciu Egerbegy
Agîrbiciu 2 Szászegerbegy
Agnita Szentágota
Agrieș Egreshely
Agrij Felsőegregy
Agriș Ruhaegres
Agriș 2 Egri
Agrișteu Egrestő
Agrișu de Jos Alsóegres
Agrișu de Sus Felsőegres
Agrișu Mare Almásegres
Agrișu Mic Bélegregy
Aita Mare Nagyajta
Aita Medie Középajta
Aita Seacă Szárazajta
Aiton Ajton
Aiud Nagyenyed
Aiudul de Sus Felenyed
Alămor Alamor
Albac Fehérvölgy
Alba Iulia Gyulafehérvár
Albești Fehéklak
Albești 2 Fehéregyháza
Albeștii Bistriței Kisfehéregyház
Albiș Albis
Albiș 2 Kézdialbis
Aldea Abásfalva
Aldești Áldófalva
Alecuș Elekes
Aleșd Élesd
Aleuș Elyüs
Alexandrița Sándortelke
Aliceni Kistartolc
Alioș Temesillésd
Alma Küküllőalmás
Almaș Háromalmás
Almaș-Săliște Almásszelistye
Almașu Váralmás
Almașu de Mijloc Középalmás
Almașu Mare Kozmaalmás
Almașu Mare 2 Nagyalmás
Almașu Mic Szalárdalmás
Almașu Mic 2 Keresztényalmás
Almașu Mic de Munte Kasalmás
Almașu Sec Szárazalmás
Alma Vii Szászalmád
Almășel Almasel
Alparea Váradalpár
Altringen Kisrékas
Alțina Alcina
Alun Álun
Alun 2 Álun
Alungeni Futásfalva
Aluniș Cseralja
Aluniș 2 Kecsed
Aluniș 3 Székelymagyaros
Aluniș 4 Magyaró
Aluniș 5 Szamosszéplak
Alunișu Magyarókereke
Alunișul Gaurény
Amați Amac
Ambud Ombod
Ampoița Kisompoly
Andreeni Magyarandrásfalva
Andreneasa Andrenyásza
Andrid Érendréd
Angheluș Angyalos
Anieș Dombhát
Anina Stájerlakanina
Aninoasa Aninoszabányatelep
Aninoasa 2 Egerpatak
Ant Ant
Antăș Antos
Apa Apa
Apadia Apádia
Apahida Apahida
Apalina Abafája
Apateu Oláhapáti
Apateu 2 Apáti
Apateu 3 Dobrácsapáti
Apatiu Dellőapáti
Apața Apáca
Apold Apold
Apoldu de Jos Kisapold
Apoldu de Sus Nagyapold
Apoș Szászapátfalva
Araci Arapatak
Arad Arad
Arăneag Székesaranyág
Arănieș Aranyos
Arcalia Árokalja
Archia Árki
Archid Szilágyerked
Archiș Bélárkos
Archita Erked
Archiud Mezőerked
Arcuș Árkos
Ardan Árdány
Ardeova Erdőfalva
Ardeu Erdőfalva
Ardud Erdőd
Ardusat Erdőszáda
Arduzel Szamosardó
Arghișu Argyas
Arieșeni Lepus
Arieșu de Cîmp Mezőaranyos
Arieșu de Pădure Erdőaranyos
Arini Lüget
Ariniș Égerhát
Ariușd Erősd
Armășeni Csikménaság
Armășenii Noi Ménaságújfalu
Armeni Örményszékes
Armeniș Örményes
Arpașu de Jos Alsóárpás
Arpașu de Sus Felsőárpás
Arpășel Arpad
Aruncuta Aranykút
Arvățeni Árvátfalva
Asinip Asszonynépe
Asuaju de Jos Alsószivágy
Asuaju de Sus Felsőszivágy
Așchileu (Așchileu Mare) Nagyesküllő
Așchileu Mic Kisesküllő
Aștileu Esküllő
Atea Atya
Ateaș Atyás
Atia Atyha
Atid Etéd
Ațel Ecel
Ațințis Cintos
Augustin Ágostonfalva
Aurel Vlaicu Bencenc
Aușeu Kisősi
Avram Iancu Ácsva
Avram Iancu 2 Keménytok
Avrămești Szentábrahám
Avrig Felek
Axente Sever Asszonyfalva
Baba Bába
Babșa Babsa
Babța Bábca
Bacău de Mijloc Bakamező
Bacea Bácsfalva
Baciu Kisbács
Bacova Bakóvár
Badon Bádon
Bahnea Bonyha
Baia Kisbaja
Baia Borșa Borsabánya
Baia de Arieș Aranyosbánya
Baia de Criș Körösbánya
Baia Mare Nagybánya
Baia Sprie Felsőbánya
Baica Bányika
Balc Bályok
Balda Bald
Baldovin Báldovin
Balinț Bálinc
Balomir Balomir
Balomiru de Cîmp Balomir
Baloșești Bégabalázsd / Balosest
Balșa Balsa
Ban Felsőbán
Bancu Csikbánkfalva
Band Mezőbánd
Banloc Bánlak
Banpotoc Bánpatak
Bara Barafalva
Baraolt Barót
Barbura Barbura
Barcani Zágonbárkány
Baru Nagybár
Baștea Bástya
Bata Batta
Batár Feketebátor
Batin Bátony
Batiz Batiz
Batoș Bátos
Băbășești Szamosberence
Băbdiu Zápróc
Băbeni Aranymező
Băbești Kisbábony
Băbiu Bábony
Băbuțiu Báboc
Băcăinți Bokajafalu
Băcel Kökösbácstelek
Băcia Bácsi
Băciia Bakonya
Bădăcin Szilágybadacsony
Bădeni Bágyon
Bădeni 2 Bágy
Bădești Bádok
Băgaciu Kisbogács
Băgaciu 2 Szászbogács
Băgara Bogártelke
Băgău Magyarbagó
Băiești Bajesd
Băile 1 Mai Püspökfürdő
Băile Bixad Bikszádfürdő
Băile Bálványos Bálványosfüred
Băile Chirui Kérulyfürdő
Băile Felix Félixfürdő
Băile Herculane Herkulefürdő
 Homoródfürdő
Băile Lipova Lippafüred
Băile Puturoasa Büdössárfürdő
Băile Șugaș Sugásfürdő
Băile Tinca Tenkefürdő
Băile Turda Tordafürdő
Băile Tușnad Tusnádfürdő
Băișoara Járabánya
Băița Rézbánya
Târgu Mureș Marosvásárhely

Russia

Serbia
For a list of Hungarian place names in the Vojvodina Region, see : Hungarian exonyms (Vojvodina)

Slovakia

Slovenia
For a list of Hungarian place names in the Prekmurje region, see: Hungarian exonyms (Prekmurje, Slovenia)

Turkey

United Kingdom

Ukraine

See also
List of European exonyms

References 
 
 
 
 

 
Exonym
Lists of exonyms